is a junction passenger railway station located in the city of  Matsudo, Chiba, Japan, and operated by East Japan Railway Company (JR East). The spelling "Shim-Matsudo" is used by JR on the station signage as the official romanization of the station name.

Lines
It is 57.5 kilometers from the western terminus of the Musashino Line at Fuchūhommachi.

Station layout
The station consists of an island platform serving two tracks (1 and 2) for Jōban Line local services. The Musashino Line tracks are at a right angle above the Joban Line tracks, and served by two opposed side platforms (3 and 4).

The station has a "Midori no Madoguchi" staffed ticket office.

Platforms

History
Shim-Matsudo Station opened on 1 April 1973 as a station on Japanese National Railways (JNR). The station was absorbed into the JR East network upon the privatization of JNR on 1 April 1987.

Passenger statistics
In fiscal 2019, the station was used by an average of 39,140 passengers daily (boarding passengers only). The passenger figures for previous years are as shown below.

See also
 List of railway stations in Japan

References

External links

JR East station information 

Railway stations in Chiba Prefecture
Railway stations in Japan opened in 1973
Jōban Line
Musashino Line
Matsudo